The National Sports Centre at Crystal Palace in south London, England is a large sports centre and outdoor athletics stadium. It was opened in 1964 in Crystal Palace Park, close to the site of the former Crystal Palace Exhibition building which had been destroyed by fire in 1936, and is on the same site as the former FA Cup Final venue which was used here between 1895 and 1914.

It was one of the five National Sports Centres, run on behalf of Sport England, but responsibility was transferred to the London Development Agency (now GLA Land and Property) and is managed by Greenwich Leisure Limited, under their Better brand logo.

The athletics stadium has a capacity of 15,500, which can be increased to 24,000 with temporary seating. It hosts international athletics meetings.

As well as sporting events, the stadium has played host to a number of live open air concerts, by artists such as Coldplay, Bruce Springsteen, Sex Pistols and Depeche Mode.

Architecture
The stadium is open to the air, and has a larger West Stand and a smaller Jubilee Stand (from 1977).

The indoor sports building was designed by the LCC Architects Department under project architect Norman Engleback between 1953–54 and is a Grade II* listed building. It has a particularly interesting interior:  there is a central concourse with a complex and delicate exposed concrete frame supporting the roof, which has a folded teak lining. The "wet" side of the central aisle houses a series of pools, including a 50m competition pool, and a diving pool with a dramatic reinforced concrete diving platform. The "dry" side has a smaller sports arena used for basketball, gymnastics and other sports.

The listing from Historic England describes the building as "exceptional in the breadth of its vision, not only in the range of facilities carefully planned within it but also in being intended to serve serious performers from all nations (there is separate residential accommodation in the park) as well as local enthusiasts."

A hexagonal tower and low-rise communal area next to the main building provided accommodation for 130 athletes.

Since 2020 the 50m pool and diving pool have been closed for repairs, which will be funded by the Greater London Authority.

Sports

Athletics
The current 15,500 seater athletics stadium was built on the site of the football ground by M J Gleeson and opened in 1964. From 1999 to 2012 it hosted the London Grand Prix. The stadium can be expanded to 24,000 with temporary seating if required.

Beach Volleyball
Sand from the Beach Volleyball Courts at Horse Guards Parade during London 2012 was donated to Crystal Palace National Sports Centre in 2012. There are three courts outside the indoor building.

Football

The current athletics stadium is on the same land as a previous football ground, which hosted the FA Cup final from 1895 to 1914 as well as other sports. In 1905, the owners wanted their own football club to play at the venue, so they formed Crystal Palace F.C. The club were forced to leave by the military, in 1915, and now play at nearby Selhurst Park.

The largest 'domestic' attendance ever at the stadium was in the 1913 Cup final between Aston Villa and Sunderland, when 121,919 spectators squeezed into the stands. The previous world record had been the 1901 Cup Final, when 114,815 amassed to watch Tottenham Hotspur and Sheffield United draw 2–2, (Spurs won the replay at Burnden Park).

The 1970–71 WFA Cup (Women's FA Cup) third-place match and final were held at the new stadium in 1971, the first final of the modern competition; it was won by Southampton Women.

Crystal Palace F.C. have played reserve team matches in the past at the centre, most recently in 2001.

In January 2011, the club's owners announced plans to relocate the club back to the site of the NSC, redeveloping it into a 40,000-seater, purpose-built football stadium. Tottenham Hotspur F.C. also released plans to redevelop the NSC into a 25,000-seater stadium, maintaining it as an athletics stadium, as part of their plans to redevelop the Olympic Stadium after the 2012 Summer Olympics and Paralympics. However, their plans were cancelled due to their failure to obtain the Olympic Stadium.

AC London used the stadium during the 2015–16 season. Croydon F.C. announced a temporary switch of home ground to Crystal Palace in 2020.

International football matches
 3 April 1897 – England 1–2 Scotland
 30 March 1901 – England 2–2 Scotland
 1 April 1905 – England 1–0 Scotland
 3 April 1909 – England 2–0 Scotland
 4 March 1911 – England Amateurs 4–0 Belgium

FA Cup Finals (1895–1914)
21 teams competed in the twenty FA Cup Finals staged at Crystal Palace, with ten different winners. Four more teams won the FA Cup during this time, after replays at other grounds. Newcastle United appeared in the most finals at the ground, five, but never lifted the cup there, whilst Aston Villa won all four of their games there.

Rugby

On 2 December 1905, the ground also held the first England rugby union international match against New Zealand in England, New Zealand winning 15–0.

On Wednesday 18 August 1965, the ground was the venue of the rugby league match in which the Commonwealth XIII rugby league team were defeated 7–15 by New Zealand.

It also played host to Fulham Rugby League in the mid-1980s for a couple of seasons, after they were forced to leave their previous ground of Craven Cottage.

Cricket

London County Cricket Club was a short-lived cricket club founded by the Crystal Palace Company. In 1898 they invited W. G. Grace to help them form a first-class cricket club. Grace accepted the offer and became the club's secretary, manager and captain. As a result, he severed his connection with Gloucestershire County Cricket Club during the 1899 season. The club played first-class matches from 1900 to 1904. Some of the best players of the time played some matches for the club while continuing to play for their usual teams, among them CB Fry, Johnny Douglas and K S Ranjitsinhji. However, the games were little more than exhibition games – and money-making exercises for Dr Grace – and so it quickly lost its first-class status, and with that the ability to attract the top players. The club folded in 1908.

Basketball

The 2,000 capacity indoor Arena at the National Sports Centre was also home to former British Basketball League team's Crystal Palace and London Towers. Crystal Palace eventually merged into the London Towers organisation in 1998, whilst after great success domestically and in European competition the Towers ran into severe financial difficulties and folded its professional team in 2006. During its most successful period, Towers alternated between Crystal Palace and Wembley Arena as its home venues.

For the 2012–2013 season, the London Lions played the home games at Crystal Palace National Sports Centre until they moved to the brand new Copper Box in 2013.

From 2018, the Arena once more became a BBL venue when it was announced as the home of the new London City Royals franchise, the second London based franchise in the league.

American Football

The stadium hosted the 1989 National Championship Game for American Football, called the Budweiser Bowl, where the Manchester Spartans won the Great Britain National Championship by defeating the Birmingham Bulls by a score of 21 – 14.  This National Championship Game was broadcast nationally on Channel 4. This was the height of the Great Britain – NFL relationship and partnership as the NFL supported the game, and the NFL commissioner and front office attended the game.  The Cleveland Browns and the Philadelphia Eagles players and cheerleaders also attended, as they were the two teams who were playing the next day in the American Bowl at Wembley Stadium.  The NFL's Tex Schramm presented Spartan player/head coach Terry Smith with the National Championship Trophy at Wembley Stadium the next day.

The stadium also hosted the 1990 National Championship Game for American Football, called the Coca-Cola Bowl, where the Manchester Spartans repeated as the Champions of Great Britain, winning their second National Championship in a row by defeating the Northampton Storm by a score of 21–19.  The NFL also attended the 1990 Great Britain Championship Game at Crystal Palace, as did the players and cheerleaders for the New Orleans Saints and the Los Angeles Raiders as they were the two teams playing in the American Bowl the next day at Wembley Stadium.

The Manchester Spartans second National Championship came only one week after the Spartans had won the European Club Championship in Italy when the Spartans defeated Dublin, Amsterdam, Berlin, and Milan to become the first British team to ever win the European Club Championship.

The player/head coach of the Manchester Spartans was Terry Smith, who also was the Great Britain National Team Head Coach.  With Smith at the helm of the Great Britain National Team in 1989, and with 12 Spartans players playing for Great Britain, the Spartans players and coach led Great Britain to the European Nations Championship in 1989 by defeating France, Germany, and Finland by a combined score of 99 – 6 for Great Britain's first European Championship for the Great Britain National Team.

The Sports Arena was also used by the London Monarchs, who also played some games at the stadium as England Monarchs before the team became defunct. The Monarchs were unfortunately never able to follow-up on their title-winning success in the inaugural World League of American Football season of 1991, never again making it to another World Bowl, the playoffs, or even a second winning record. Their title defence never materialised, ending 1992 with a 2-7-1 tally; after a two-year league hiatus, four seasons from 1995 to 1998 in a revived league of six European cities garnered three straight 4-6 records, before bowing out with a 3–7.

The main stadium pitch is currently used by the London Olympians and is the home of the Great Britain Lions, the national American football team.  The stadium played host to the 2011 Britbowl, the championship game of the British American Football League, which was won by the London Blitz.

Motor racing

Crystal Palace race circuit was located in Crystal Palace Park, the outline of the track can still be seen on maps providing access to the Crystal Palace National Sports Centre that is also located in the park.

The circuit opened in 1927 and the first race, for motorcycles, was on 21 May 1927. The circuit was 1 mile long, and ran on pre-existing paths through the park, including a loop past the lake. The surface had tarmac-covered bends, but the straights only had hard-packed gravel.

Later that year, during the International Imperial Trophy meeting also won by Bira, the BBC broadcast the first ever televised motor racing.

With the outbreak of World War II, the park was taken over by the Ministry of Defence, and it would not be until 1953 that race meetings could take place again. The circuit had been reduced in length to 1.39 miles, bypassing the loop past the lake, and pressure from the local residents reduced motor sport in the park to five days a year. A variety of races took place at the circuit including sports cars, Formula Three, the London Trophy for Formula Two, and even non-championship Formula One races.

The final meeting was held on 23 September 1972, but club events continued until 1974. Although the circuit no longer exists, it can be driven in the Grand Prix Legends historical motor racing simulation, for which it was recreated in detail. It was later converted to several other racing simulation programs.
Adjacent to the Olympic swimming pool exists a small race circuit for radio-controlled cars. The site is the home of the London Radio Car Club (LRCC).

The first British Motor Show (then known as the 'London Motor Show', which was one of the first of its kind in the world), was held at Crystal Palace in 1903. Organised by the Society of Motor Manufacturers and Traders (SMMT) it subsequently moved to Olympia for the next 32 years.

Reuse of circuit (1997–) 

In 1997, the Sevenoaks & District Motor Club started a series of sprint events using part of the old infield link, the main straight and north tower corner. The events lasted three years before being stopped due to park development work. Following discussions with the local council and the London Development Agency, sprint racing restarted at the park, with the two-day event held 30/31 May 2010. This event was repeated on the same or adjacent weekend each year, until 2017, when it was held on the August Bank Holiday weekend. The event was suspended in 2018 but took place in May 2019. It was scheduled to take place again in May 2020 and May 2021 but was cancelled due to the COVID-19 pandemic.

Crystal Palace Sports Arena 

Crystal Palace Sports Arena was a proposed football stadium to be built in Crystal Palace Park, to replace Selhurst Park as the home stadium of Crystal Palace Football Club. It was announced in January 2011, as a redevelopment of the current Crystal Palace National Sports Centre, and was planned to be ready for the 2015–16 football season. Crystal Palace F.C. submitted plans to rebuild the stadium as a 40,000 seater football stadium without a running track, but with a new indoor aquatic and sports centre as part of the complex. A London Tramlink extension to the area was proposed to coincide with the completion of the stadium.

However, on 4 December 2017, Crystal Palace F.C. unveiled plans to redevelop Selhurst Park and expand its capacity to 34,000, which suggested they have now abandoned plans to redevelop the National Sports Centre.

References

External links

 Crystal Palace National Sports Centre

Athletics venues in London
Basketball venues in England
Crystal Palace F.C.
Defunct football venues in London
Football venues in London
Defunct rugby league venues in England
London Broncos
Defunct rugby union venues in England
FA Cup Final venues
Grade II* listed buildings in the London Borough of Bromley
Sports venues in London
Swimming venues in London
Tourist attractions in the London Borough of Bromley
Sports academies
Sports venues completed in 1964
1964 establishments in England
American football venues in the United Kingdom
Crystal Palace, London
Diamond League venues